James Moiben (born 20 April 1977) is a male long-distance runner from Kenya. He set his personal best (2:10:07) in the men's marathon at the 1999 Paris Marathon.

Achievements

External links
marathoninfo

1977 births
Living people
Kenyan male long-distance runners